The Northern East West Freight Corridor, usually referred to as the N.E.W. Corridor, is a project organized by the International Union of Railways UIC and Transportutvikling AS to connect the East Coast  of the United States to East Asia by rail and maritime routes.

Route

The plan calls for two main routes. Both routes start from east coast ports of North America such as Halifax Harbour, then across the Atlantic Ocean to the port of Narvik, from there by rail, often called the Eurasian Land Bridge, through Sweden to Finland and Russia. From Russia there are two routes: either via the Trans-Siberian Railway to Vostochny Port, or though Kazakhstan to Ürümqi in China. From Ürümqi the route goes to Lanzhou and possibly to the port city Lianyungang.

The project was financed for a test run in 2006 through NEW Corridor AS, a company owned 65% by UIC and 35% by a Norwegian county, Nordland.

Current status
As of 2020, there is no transshipment of containers between oceangoing ships and railway in Narvik. But the same year container transport of fish (eastbound) and mixed goods westbound between Narvik and Chongqing (China) started as an extension of the established rail connection between Helsinki (Finland) and Chongqing.

Benefits
Transportutvikling claims in their report that this corridor will be an important alternative to the traditional shipping route from China to the U.S.A. The main reasons given are:
 Shorter route for some destinations. The route seems longer on a traditional map, but on a globe it is easy to see that it is shorter than alternatives through central Europe.
 Reduced transit time, because of faster land transport and shorter travel distance.
 Compared to shipping from China, there is a special advantage for parts of China far away from the coast, those containers must be freighted a long way on railway anyway. These areas are the main initial target for the NEW.
 The route does not have the congestion problem of the densely populated areas of coastal China and constrained ports in the west coast USA. Because the route goes through sparsely populated areas, it is relatively easy and cheap to increase capacity.
 Most of the infrastructure is already there. The main need is expanding ports and making train shifts at borders more efficient.
 The port of Narvik in northern Norway is ice-free all year, with a railway connection to Russia through Sweden and Finland.
 This route avoids the six bottlenecks of global shipping: the Panama Canal, the Suez Canal, the Straits of Gibraltar, the Bosporus, the Straits of Hormuz and the Straits of Malacca, which 60% of all shipping passes through.
 It is a backup solution in case of terror or traffic incidents, conflict in South China Sea or labour strikes on the Pacific shipping route. The west coast port strike showed how important and crucial ports are for the U.S. economy.

Problems

Technical
Major issues with the corridor are technical, financial and political. The technical issues are:
 The track gauges differs. Russia and Kazakhstan use , Finland uses , while China, Sweden and Norway use . This break of gauge adds overhead at border crossings. This effect can arguably be decreased with efficiency and investments.
 Increasing train speeds. The Trans-Siberian Railway is currently increasing service speed to 55 kilometres per hour. The route would have to reduce time on track and when changing tracks.
 Increasing the limited port capacity in Narvik for China–US trade.
 Reducing round trip time for the customers by increasing speed and frequency. This requires a high volume of goods.
 Railway capacity. There is not capacity for 45 more trains per day along the Malmbanan (Sweden has upgraded the railway near the Finnish border, now in acceptable state). There are suggestions to build a railway Skibotn (Norway)– Kolari (Finland) for this traffic and mining products from the Kolari region, or a railway from Kirkenes. It would have  and would avoid one of the break-of-gauges.

Political
The political issues are more severe than the technical:
 The bureaucratic procedures at border crossings is long, inefficient and problematic. Several days of the journey is inefficiently used at borders.
 The border crossing of Kazakhstan need more negotiating.
 Even though Russia is stable, it is in 121st place in Index of Economic Freedom, while China and Kazakhstan are ranked 111 and 113 respectively. NEW's proponents say that the corridor has lower risk than the alternatives, and reduces risk by increasing the alternatives.
 Railway track is vulnerable in a way that ocean shipping routes are not. A train crash, railway sabotage or terrorism can stop all transport for weeks. The Trans-Siberian Railway by its very length is hard to protect. On the other hand, sea piracy in the Gulf of Aden has become a serious problem for the Europe-Asia shipping. There is no such problem for the USA-Asia shipping.

Financial
The most crucial issues are financial. 
For this route to be possible the frequency of departure to be above a minimum rate, otherwise days will be wasted waiting for departures, and time is an important factor. Chinese ports handled  in 2003 (an increase of 29.7% from 2002). If only 50% of this volume could be carried out by train it will represent approximately 4 daily trains along the N.E.W. Corridor", according to Mr. Xiao, Managing Director of Sinotrans (June 29, 2003, Helsinki).
Shipping over the Pacific Ocean and using container trains in the US, or through Panama Canal are the established transport route between China and eastern USA. They probably have lower costs.
Trains between interior China and interior Europe have low market shares, even if those routes are more competitive on rail than the NEWC.

Start up issues
There is also the problem financing the start up phase of the corridor. The Chinese, Kazakh, Russian, Finnish, Swedish and Norwegian bureaucracy has to approve plans, improve routines and train customs officers. There is need for infrastructure improvement. And finally there have to be enough trains to run at several times a day on a rail journey taking up to 14–28 days for a train round trip. 45 trains every day on a two-week round trip adds up to about 630 trains.

Competitive routes

Apart from shipping all the way between USA and China, maritime/railways routes other than through Narvik are possible. Reloading could be done in Murmansk or in a port in the Baltic Sea, avoiding the break-of-gauge at the Swedish-Finnish border, and involving fewer countries. The Russians prefer to use their own ports. 

Suggestions involving building new railways include ports in Kirkenes or Skibotn in Norway, both without any break-of-gauge.

Containers China-Europe are not planned to go over Narvik; instead they go by rail all the way, either through Poland or through Finland. However shipping over the Indian Ocean/Suez Canal is the most common route for now. Reloading ship/rail is avoided especially if low volume, because of the delay to have enough number of trains to fill up a ship.

Containers USA-Europe go to other ports, depending on European destination. For Scandinavia they go through Gothenburg. For Russia they go through Saint Petersburg. It is hard to change this since the volume of these ports and the fact that they are located closer to the end-destination make them more competitive than Narvik.

See also

References

Rail transport in Europe
Rail transport in Asia
International rail transport
Sea lanes
Transport in the Arctic